This is a list of diplomatic missions in Brazil. At present, the capital city of Brasília hosts 130 embassies. Several other countries have ambassadors accredited to Brazil, with most being resident in Washington, D.C. or in New York City (United Nations).

Honorary consulates are excluded from this listing.

Embassies in Brasília

Other missions in Brasília
  (Delegation)
  (Mission)
  (Taipei Economic and Cultural Office in Brazil)

Consular missions

Bagé
  (Consulate)

Belém

  (Consulate General)
  (Vice-Consulate)
  (Consulate General)

Belo Horizonte

  (Consulate)
  (Consulate) 
  (Consulate)
  (Consulate)
  (Consulate General) 
  (Embassy Branch Office) 
  (Consulate)

Boa Vista
  (Consulate General)

Cáceres
  (Consulate)

Campo Grande
  (Consulate)

Chuí
  (Consulate)

Corumbá
  (Consulate)

Curitiba

  (Consulate)
  (Consulate General)
  (Consulate General)
  (Consulate General)
  (Consulate General) 
  (Vice-Consulate)
  (Consulate General)

Epitaciolândia
  (Consulate, formerly located in the twin city of Brasileia)

Florianópolis

  (Consulate)
  (Consulate General)

Fortaleza
  (Vice-Consulate)

Foz do Iguaçu

  (Consulate)
  (Consulate)

Guajará-Mirim
  (Consulate)

Guaíra
  (Consulate)

Jaguarão
  (Consulate)

Manaus

  (Consulate General)
  (Consulate General)
  (Consulate General)

Paranaguá
  (Consulate)
  (Consulate)

Ponta Porã
  (Consulate)

Porto Alegre

  (Consulate)
  (Consulate General)
  (Consulate General) 
  (Consulate General)
  (Consular Office)
  (Consulate)
  (Vice-Consulate)
  (Consulate General)
  (Consulate General)
  (Consulate General)

Porto Murtinho
  (Consulate)

Quaraí
  (Consulate)

Recife

  (Consulate)
  (Consulate General) 
  (Consulate General)
  (Consulate General)
  (Consulate)
  (Consular Office)
  (Vice-Consulate)
  (Consulate General)
  (Consulate General)

Rio Branco
  (Consulate General)

Rio de Janeiro

  (Consulate General) 
  (Consulate)
  (Consulate General)
  (Consulate General)
  (Consulate General)
  (Consulate General)
  (Consulate General)
  (Consulate General)
  (Consulate General)
  (Consulate General) 
  (Consulate General) 
  (Consulate General)
  (Consulate General) 
  (Consulate General) 
  (Consulate General) 
  (Consulate General)
  (Consulate General) 
  (Consulate General)
  (Consulate General)
  (Consulate General)
  (Consulate General)
  (Consulate General) 
  (Consulate General)
  (Consulate General) 
  (Consulate General)  
  (Consulate General) 
  (Consulate General)
  (Consulate General)

Salvador da Bahia

  (Consulate)
  (Consulate General)
  (Consulate General)

Santana do Livramento
  (Consulate)

Santos

  (Consulate General)

São Paulo

  (Consulate General)
  (Consulate General)
  (Consulate General) 
  (Consulate General) 
  (Consulate General)
  (Consulate General)
  (Consulate General)
  (Consulate General)
  (Consulate General)
  (Consulate General)
  (Consulate General)
  (Consulate General) 
  (Consulate General) 
  (Consulate General)
  (Consulate)
  (Commercial Office)
  (Consulate)
  (Consulate General)
  (Consulate General)
  (Consulate General)
  (Consulate General)
  (Consulate General)
  (Consulate General)
  (Consulate General)
  (Consulate General)
  (Consulate General)
  (Consulate General) 
  (Consulate General) 
  (Consulate General) 
  (Consulate General) 
  (Consulate General) 
  (Consulate General)
  (Consulate General)
  (Consulate General)
  (Consulate General)
  (Consulate General) 
  (Consulate General) 
  (Consulate General)
  (Consulate General)
  (Consulate General)
  (Consulate General) 
  (Consulate General) 
  (Economic & Cultural Office)
  (Consulate General) 
  (Consulate General) 
  (Consulate General)
  (Consulate General)
  (Consulate General)

Tabatinga
  (Consulate)

Uruguaiana
  (Consulate)

Non-resident embassies accredited to Brazil

Resident in Havana, Cuba:

 
 
 
  
  

Resident in New York City, United Nations:

  
 
  
 
  
  
  
 
 
 
  
 
 
 
  

Resident in Washington, D.C., United States of America:

 
 
 
 
 
 
  
 
  
 
 
 
 
 
 
  
 
 

Resident in other cities:

  (Ottawa)
  (St. John's)
  (Ottawa)
  (Roseau)
  (Tallinn)
  (Kingston)
  (Lisbon)
  (Brasília, Embassy of Switzerland)
  (Buenos Aires)
  (Caracas)
  (Domagnano, San Marino)

Countries without an accredited non-resident embassy to Brazil 

 
  
  (Honorary Consulate in Fortaleza)
 
 
 
 
 
 
  (Honorary Consulate in São Paulo) 
  (Honorary Consulate in São Paulo)

Gallery

Closed missions

See also 
 Foreign relations of Brazil
 List of diplomatic missions of Brazil
 Ministry of Foreign Affairs of Brazil
 Visa requirements for Brazilian citizens

References 

Brazil
Diplomatic missions
Diplomatic missions in Brazil